George Meniuc (20 May 1918, Chişinău – 8 February 1987, Chişinău) was a writer from Moldova.

Biography  
George Meniuc was born on 20 May 1918, in Chişinău. He graduate from the University of Bucharest; his professors were Tudor Vianu, Petre P. Negulescu, Dimitrie Gusti, Mircea Florian. In 1940, he returned to Chişinău George Meniuc was editor in chief of Nistru, a newspaper of the Moldovan Writers' Union.

George Meniuc died on 8 February 1987 and was buried in Chişinău.

Awards 
 Premiul de Stat al RSSM pentru literatură, 1972. 
 "Scriitor al poporului din Moldova", 1982.

Works
Poems
Cântecul zorilor (1948)
Poezii (1954)
Strofe lirice (1956)
Poeme (1957)
Versuri alese (1958)
Vremea Lerului (1969), 
Florile dalbe (1979), 
Toamna lui Orfeu (1983).

Essays: 
Imaginea în artă (1940), 
Iarba fiarelor (1959), 
Cadran solar (1966), 
Eseuri (1967).
Vulpea isteaţă, Editura Prut Internaţional, Chişinău;

References

Bibliography
 Anatol Eremia, Unitatea patrimoniului onomastic românesc. Toponimie. Antroponimie ediţie jubiliară, 2001, Centrul Naţional de Terminologie, ed. „Iulian”, Chişinău, .

External links 

 România Literară, George Meniuc 

1918 births
1987 deaths
Eastern Orthodox Christians from Romania
University of Bucharest alumni
Writers from Chișinău
Moldovan male writers
Romanian writers
Soviet writers